Gaeleri is a Swedish hard rock band from Helsingborg. The band was formed in 1992 when the remains of Seventeen found a new singer in Anders Vidhav (Bengtsson). Their ability to mix a hard and heavy pounding background with melodic colourful acoustic sound creates the unique sound that has always been the trade mark of the band.

History

The '90s - taking off
The band was formed in November 1992 when the remaining three quarters of the band 17 – Seventeen, Niklas Rollgard, Jonas Andersson (Scratch, Unameous) and Patrik Borgkvist (Anette Olzen) joined forces with Anders Vidhav (Båga Biit, Derringer, Pudelsi). The band got a flying start and they soon signed a record deal with the German label Inline Music along with a publishing deal with Warner/Chappell Music. During the spring 1993 the band was busy writing song for their debut album, which was recorded already during summer the same year in Delta Studios, Wilster, Germany, with Mike Bettison as producer.

Due to the record company having financial problems, the release was postponed numerous times and in 1994, after the managing director had emptied the company of all its funds, the label finally went bankrupt. The year after, Ole Bergfleth of the German label Dream Circle Records heard the recordings by chance and decided to acquire the rights and in 1996 Gaeleri's self-titled debut album was finally released. The album received great reviews in the press, e.g. 6 out of 7 in the German magazine Metal Hammer, but only a limited first edition reached the market before bad luck once again struck the band - this label went bankrupt as well. This first album is almost impossible to find these days and it has become a collector's item.

Rising from the unfortunate start the band spent most of 1997 touring Scandinavia and started recording their second album Still Here in Airplay Studios, Stockholm with Uffe "Chris Laney" Larsson and Pontus Norgren as producers and with guest appearance by Thomas Vikström and Lena Vikström on backing vocals. The album was later mixed by Anders "Theo" Theander at Roastinghouse Records, Malmö, and was finally released in 1999 by the Danish label Kick Music (later Sony Music). The band signed a publishing deal with Scandinavian songs for this album. With this album the band showcased their ability to mix acoustic guitars with heavy guitar riffs in strong hooky melodies. With this album the band certainly proved that they were a force to be reckoned with. Still Here was well received by their fans and received great reviews from the press, e.g. 8,5 out of 10 in HardRoxx online. The song "Crying Out" featured on the compilation A Fist Full of Rock 'n Roll volume 13.

The '00s - disbanding
The band followed up Still Here with a tour in Sweden and began writing the songs that would end up on their third album. In spring 2001 the band started recording the album A Brighter Day at Roasting House Studios in Malmö, Sweden, with Anders "Theo" Theander as producer. The album was released by Kick Music in 2002. When the recordings were finished Jonas Andersson decided to leave the band and was later replaced by Jokke Rosén. With their third album the band ventured into a more melodic and AOR oriented style and once again showcased very strong melodies. The album was well received by critics in the European press. The band recorded a video for the song "Blue Town" which was released the same year. The same song also featured on the compilation Munich's Hardest Hits vol 6. In spite of great reviews the album never really took off and all the years of struggling finally took its toll on the members and in 2004 Gaeleri was disbanded.

The '10s - an amazing comeback
Late 2011, lead singer Anders Vidhav and guitarist Niklas Rollgard decided to get back writing music together again and to invite the other original members of the band to a reunion. After spending 2012 writing songs, the band was finally reunited and the recording of the upcoming album Gates of Rome started late 2013.

The album was recorded in Ladahland studios Helsingborg, Sweden, with Jokke Petterson as co-producer and engineer. The final mixing was done by Anders "Theo" Theander at Roastinghouse Studios, Malmö, Sweden. All songs on the album are published by Roastinghouse/BMG Chrysalis. The album was released worldwide in September–October 2014 by the Swedish label TBM Records.

Current members
 Anders Vidhav (Bengtsson) - Vocals (1992–present)
 Niklas Rollgard - Guitar (1992–present)
 Jonas Andersson - Bass (1992–2002, 2012–present)
 Patrik Borgkvist - Drums (1992–present)

Former members
 Jokke Rosén - Bass (2002–2004)

Discography

Albums
 Gallery (1996)
 Still here... (1999)
 A Brighter Day (2002)
 Gates of Rome (2014)

Singles
 "Maybe my Eyes" (promo single) (2000)

Compilations
 Export Music Catalogue - featuring "Maybe My Eyes" (1999)
 Swedish Artists - featuring "Crying Out" (2000)
 Scandinavian Artists - featuring "A Brighter Day" (2001)
 A Fist Full Of Rock 'n Roll, volume 13 - featuring "Crying Out" (2003)
 Munich's Hardest Hits, volume 6 - featuring "Blue Town" (2004)

Other projects
 He's a man - together with Tina Stenberg (2002)
 Where is the Fire - Various Artists - United (2005)

References

Further reading
 Metal Hammer magazine (German) - issue No.7, 1996
 Rock Hard magazine (German) - issue 109, 1996
 Rock It! magazine (German) - issue 02/2003 (Heft Nr14) Jahrgang 4, February/March

External links
 

Swedish hard rock musical groups
Musical groups from Helsingborg